Michael Curb (born December 24, 1944) is an American musician, record company executive, motorsports car owner, philanthropist, and former politician. He is also the founder of Curb Records where he presently serves as the chairman. Curb also serves as Chairman of Word Entertainment. He is an inductee of the West Coast Stock Car Hall of Fame. A Republican, Curb served as the 42nd lieutenant governor of California from 1979 to 1983. As of 2023, he is the most recent Republican to be elected Lieutenant Governor of California.

Early life and education 
Curb was born in Savannah, Georgia to Charles McCloud Curb and Stella (Stout) Curb, and raised in Southern California's San Fernando Valley. He has one sister. After attending Grant High School, he attended  San Fernando Valley State College (now California State University, Northridge). His maternal grandmother was of Mexican heritage.

Career

Music 
At the age of 18, Curb formed Sidewalk Records (a predecessor of Curb Records) and helped launch the careers of multiple West Coast rock and roll artists.

Curb scored the music for the short film Skaterdater (1965), as well as The Wild Angels (1966), Thunder Alley (1967), Devil's Angels (1967), The Born Losers (1967) (the first of the Billy Jack films), Maryjane (1968), The Wild Racers (1968), The Savage Seven (1968), The Big Bounce (1969), The Sidehackers (1969) and Black Water Gold (1970). In 1969, his company merged with MGM Records and he became president of both MGM Records and Verve Records. Curb composed or supervised more than 50 film scores and wrote more than 400 songs.

In 1969, he co-wrote a new theme for the TV series American Bandstand, which was used until 1974.
 Curb had a Top 40 pop hit in early 1971 with the title cut from his album Burning Bridges (written and composed by Lalo Schifrin and Mike Curb) which was used as the theme of Brian G. Hutton's film, starring Clint Eastwood, Kelly's Heroes. The song reached No. 1 in South Africa, Australia and New Zealand.

The Mike Curb Congregation had an adult contemporary chart hit in 1970 with the song "Sweet Gingerbread Man" from the film The Magic Garden of Stanley Sweetheart and had a Top Ten Billboard AC hit in 1973 with the Sherman Brothers composition "It's a Small World". They performed the title song for Frank Sinatra's Dirty Dingus Magee (1970). The group was featured on Sammy Davis Jr.'s No. 1 Billboard Hot 100 hit of 1972, "The Candy Man" (the Aubrey Woods version was featured in the film Willy Wonka & the Chocolate Factory). They sang backup on Jud Strunk's 1973 hit "Daisy a Day".

The Mike Curb Congregation were weekly regulars on Glen Campbell's CBS television show. In 1969, Curb signed Christian rock pioneer Larry Norman, DeGarmo & Key, 2nd Chapter of Acts, and Debby Boone - artists considered to be the earliest Contemporary Christian Music Artists. Curb wrote and produced music for the Hanna-Barbera animated series Cattanooga Cats. The theme for the cartoon series Hot Wheels is credited to Mike Curb and the Curbstones.

In the 1970s, Curb wrote and produced for Roy Orbison, Marie Osmond and the Osmond Family, Lou Rawls, Sammy Davis Jr. and Solomon Burke; he also signed artists such as the Sylvers, Eric Burdon, War, Richie Havens, the Five Man Electrical Band, Gloria Gaynor, Johnny Bristol, Exile, 
The Four Seasons and the Dutch singer Heintje Simons and The Mob (Chicago band). Curb ran a short-lived country music subsidiary label for Motown called Hitsville Records.
He co-wrote the lyrics for "It Was a Good Time". He received BMI awards for composing "Burning Bridges" for Clint Eastwood's Kelly's Heroes, and for composing "All for the Love of Sunshine".

Curb served as chairman of the Inaugural Youth Concert for President Richard Nixon's second term on January 20, 1973. He enlisted many artists from MGM records as well as others to perform for the historic event. Solomon Burke, The Mob, Jimmy Osmond, Tommy Roe, Ray Stevens, The Sylvers, The Don Costa Orchestra, and Laurie Lea Schaefer were on the stage for the young audience. He served as emcee for the program.

In 2021, Fisk Jubilee Singers won Grammy awards for Celebrating Fisk! (The 150th Anniversary Album) under Best Roots Gospel Album category. The album was produced under the label of Curb Records, under the auspices of Curb and Paul Kwami, of which Mike Curb and Paul Kwami won a GRAMMY Award.

MGM anti-drug controversy
In 1969 Mike Curb merged his company with MGM and became President of MGM Records at the age of 24.  Curb has always disputed that any acts were dropped from MGM for only drug-related reasons, nevertheless, in 1970, Billboard reported that "MGM Records president Mike Curb has dropped 18 acts who, in his opinion, promote and exploit hard drugs through music." Billboard reported that Curb was alarmed by the drug-related deaths of Janis Joplin, Jimi Hendrix, and Alan Wilson of Canned Heat. Among the musicians incorrectly thought to be included in the purge were The Velvet Underground and Frank Zappa's group The Mothers of Invention; however, Zappa spoke out against drug use throughout his career and, by early 1969, had fulfilled his MGM/Verve contract and moved to his own Bizarre Records label, distributed by Warner Bros. The Velvet Underground had already left the label by then to sign with Atlantic Records, who released their fourth studio album Loaded. Also, when Eric Burdon, who was an advocate of psychedelics, dared Curb to release him from his contract although he was his biggest selling artist, Curb acquiesced. Burdon also launched a campaign—by distributing bumper stickers—called Curb the Clap.

Curb claimed industry support, and the record company official he cited was Bill Gallagher, the president of Paramount Records. Columbia Records president Clive Davis said Curb was "grandstanding", and that his anti-drug stance had made him "a minor hero of the Nixon administration." In 1997, Curb stated the affair had happened at a time when "you were considered a freak if you spoke out against drugs."

Political career

Encouraged to enter politics in part by Ronald Reagan, Curb was elected Lieutenant Governor of California in 1978, defeating the incumbent Democrat, Mervyn M. Dymally. Democratic candidate Jerry Brown was re-elected governor in the same year. During much of Brown's 1979–1980 bid to become the Democratic presidential candidate, Curb was acting governor, vetoing legislation, issuing executive orders and making appointments; actions the California Supreme Court upheld as Curb's constitutional prerogative. According to the December 28, 1979 edition of the San Francisco Chronicle, "...the California Supreme Court ruled yesterday that when the governor is out of state, the lieutenant governor is free to exercise all powers of the chief executive...". Curb worked with Harvey Milk on the campaign against the Briggs Initiative and persuaded Reagan to oppose it, leading to its defeat. Curb has been a leading conservative supporter of gay rights ever since. In 2023, Curb achieved a major victory in his challenge to Tennessee Governor Bill Lee, where the court declared it unconstitutional to force private businesses to post discriminatory LGBT signs.

Curb lost the 1982 Republican gubernatorial nomination to California Attorney General George Deukmejian. In 1986, Curb ran again for lieutenant governor as the Republican nominee against the incumbent Democrat, Leo T. McCarthy, in a bitterly contested race, largely run on the issue of punishment for drug trafficking and violent crimes. A vocal opponent of drug use, Curb advocated extension of the death penalty to include drug pushers whose narcotics trafficking resulted in a death. As of 2021, he is the last Republican elected lieutenant governor; Abel Maldonado was appointed to the position by then Governor Arnold Schwarzenegger but lost the subsequent election to then San Francisco mayor and future Governor Gavin Newsom. In 1980, Curb was co-chairman of Ronald Reagan's successful presidential campaign. Curb was also chairman of the convention program in Detroit and was later appointed by Reagan to be chairman of the national finance committee.

Involvement in car racing
A motorsport enthusiast, Curb is a co-owner of the Curb Agajanian Performance Group, a team that has won 10 national championships. His sponsorship and ownership have included three of NASCAR's most celebrated drivers: he previously owned Richard Petty's famed No. 43 car in 1984 and 1985, during which Petty achieved his 199th and 200th career wins. Curb was also a sponsor for Dale Earnhardt during his 1980 Winston Cup championship winning season, and sponsored Darrell Waltrip's No. 12 Toyota Tundra in the Craftsman Truck Series, driven by Joey Miller in 2006. Curb-Agajanian also ran cars for many years in the Indianapolis 500, including for Dan Wheldon and Alexander Rossi, with whom he won the 2011 and 2016 Indianapolis 500s respectively.

Curb was the only car owner to win in all 10 NASCAR auto racing series in the United States – the Monster Energy NASCAR Cup Series (formerly Nextel/Sprint Cup and Winston Cup), the Xfinity Series (formerly the Nationwide series and Busch Series), the Gander Outdoors Truck Series (formerly the Camping World Truck Series and Craftsman Truck Series), the Grand-Am Rolex Daytona Prototype National Sports Car Series (now the United Sports Car Series merged with American Le Mans), the IMSA GT Series (formerly IMSA Camel GT), Continental Series (formerly IMSA GTS), the Late Model All American Series, the Modifieds and the K&N East and West Series.

Curb was the co-owner with Richard Childress of the No. 98 Chevrolet driven by Austin Dillon. Curb is also a long-time sponsor of ThorSport Racing in the Truck Series, being part-owner of the team's No. 98 Ford driven by Grant Enfinger. He also maintained a similar partnership with Phil Parsons Racing in the Cup Series, which also ran the No. 98. The Curb Racing team has cars in United States Automobile Club (USAC) competition. Their drivers Christopher Bell and Rico Abreu won the 2013 and 2014 USAC National Midget tours.

Elvis House
In 2006, Curb purchased a house at 1034 Audubon Drive, Memphis, which was once owned by Elvis Presley. Curb renovated the house and turned it over to the Mike Curb Institute at Rhodes College.

Awards and honors
In Nashville, Curb has become a civic leader and benefactor of Belmont University, where his donation toward the construction of a new arena resulted in it being named the Curb Event Center. The university runs the Mike Curb College of Entertainment and Music Business. Curb endowed the Curb Center and the Curb Creative Campus program at Vanderbilt University and the Mike Curb Institute of Music at Rhodes College in Memphis.

In 2001, Curb was inducted into the Junior Achievement U.S. Business Hall of Fame. Curb was inducted into the Georgia Music Hall of Fame in 2003 and the North Carolina Music Hall of Fame in 2009.

In August 2006, Curb pledged $10 million to California State University, Northridge (CSUN) (in Los Angeles) to endow his alma mater's arts college and provide a lead gift for the university's regional performing arts center. Of the $10 million gift, $5 million supported CSUN's College of Arts, Media, and Communication, one of the university's largest colleges that offers degree and certificate programs for more than 4,400 students. Of the gift, $4 million went into a general endowment for the college, and $1 million endowed a faculty chair specializing in music industry studies. As a result, the college was named in his honor. Studies with in the Mike Curb College of Arts, Media, and Communication include Media, Arts, Music, Business, Journalism, and Communication Studies.

On June 29, 2007, Curb was honored with the 2,341st star on the Hollywood Walk of Fame.

CSU Channel Islands dedicated the Mike Curb Studio in Napa Hall at the Camarillo, California campus on October 21, 2010. The studio is a post-production and film and video production facility.

In 2014, Curb was inducted into the Musicians Hall of Fame and Museum in Nashville, Tennessee and in 2016, he was inducted into the Tennessee Sports Hall of Fame. He was awarded Ray Fox Memorial Award of Living Legends of Auto Racing in Daytona in 2017. In 2018, Racers Reunion featured him in Men Who Changed Racing with Harry Miller and Sam Nunis. Curb was inducted to North Carolina Music Hall of Fame in the same year for his "contributions and support of the Hall of Fame". In 2019, Curb received Junior Achievement National Centennial Leadership Award from Junior Achievement.

Discography

Albums

Collaboration albums

Singles

Guest singles

See also 
 List of minority governors and lieutenant governors in the United States

References

External links
 MikeCurb.com
 Mike Curb Family Foundation
 
 
 [ The Mike Curb Congregation] at Allmusic
 

1944 births
Living people
American entertainment industry businesspeople
Songwriters from Georgia (U.S. state)
IndyCar Series team owners
Lieutenant Governors of California
NASCAR team owners
Musicians from Savannah, Georgia
Record producers from California
California Republicans
Musicians from Nashville, Tennessee
California State University, Northridge alumni
American male composers
20th-century American composers
21st-century American composers
Smash Records artists
American politicians of Mexican descent
Tennessee Republicans
Songwriters from Tennessee
20th-century American male musicians
21st-century American male musicians
American male songwriters
Latino conservatism in the United States